Hillsdale station can refer to the following train stations:
Hillsdale (Caltrain station), California
Hillsdale (NJT station), New Jersey
Hillsdale (NYCRR station), New York, now closed